Persiophis is a genus of snake in the family Colubridae  that contains the sole species Persiophis fahimii. It is commonly known as Fahimi's ground snake.

It is found in Iran.

References 

Colubrids
Monotypic snake genera
Reptiles described in 2020
Reptiles of Iran